Bellac is a commune in the Haute-Vienne department in the Nouvelle-Aquitaine region in western France.

Inhabitants are known as Bellachons.

Bellac is where the French author Jean Giraudoux, writer of  L'Apollon de Bellac, was born in 1882. His house has been turned into a museum.

Geography
The hills known as the  lie immediately to the south.

Administration
Bellac is a sous-préfecture of Haute-Vienne, governing eight cantons and 63 communes.

Transport
However, the latest thinking is that the RCEA will be re-routed from La Souterraine south down the A20 to Limoges and then via upgraded to the N520/N141 routes to Angoulême and the west.

Classifications

Notable people 
 Jean Giraudoux (1882–1944), writer, dramatist and playwright, was born in Bellac
 Charles Silvestre (1889–1948), writer, winner of the Prix Femina in 1926, died in Bellac

See also
Communes of the Haute-Vienne department
Anne Pierpont Morgan helped France in two world wars. For her work in Bellac see Wikipedia and the Morgan Library website.

References

Communes of Haute-Vienne
Subprefectures in France
County of La Marche